Il Madone is a mountain of the Lepontine Alps, located in the Swiss canton of Ticino. On its southern side lies Lago del Narèt.

References

External links
 Il Madone on Hikr

Mountains of the Alps
Mountains of Switzerland
Mountains of Ticino
Lepontine Alps